The men's high jump at the 2018 European Athletics Championships took place at the Olympic Stadium on 9 and 11 August.

Records

Schedule

Results

Qualification
Qualification: 2.27 m (Q) or best 12 performances (q)

Final

References

High Jump M
High jump at the European Athletics Championships